Gustavo Garzón (born May 25, 1955 in Buenos Aires) is an Argentine film and television actor.

He works in the cinema of Argentina.

Filmography
 Cosa de locos (1981)
 Tacos altos (1985)
 Los Días de junio (1985) a.k.a. Days in June
 Sostenido en La menor (1986) a.k.a. Padre, marido y amante
 Los Amores de Laurita (1986)
 La Clínica del Dr. Cureta (1987)
 La Ciudad oculta (1989)
 Despabílate amor (1996) a.k.a. Wake Up Love
 El Mundo contra mí (1997)
 Qué absurdo es haber crecido (2000) a.k.a. How Silly We Are to Grow Up
 Gallito Ciego (2001)
 El Fondo del Mar (2003) a.k.a. The Bottom of the Sea
 Roma (2004)
 El Buen destino (2005)
 Amor en defensa propia (2006)
 Florianópolis Dream (2018)

As a music video director
 Vivir Sin Aire (Maná, 1994)
 Te Lloré Un Río (Maná, 1994)
 Déjame Entrar (Maná, 1995)
 No Ha Parado de Llover (Maná, 1995)
 Pies Descalzos, Sueños Blancos (Shakira, 1996)
 ¿Dónde Estás Corazón? (Shakira, 1996)
 Un Poco de Amor (Shakira, 1997)
 Perdido Sin Ti (Ricky Martin, 1998)
 Ciega, Sordomuda (Shakira, 1998) 
 No Creo (Shakira, 1999)
 Inevitable (Shakira, 1999)
 Fuera de Mí (La Ley, 2000)
 Yo No Soy Esa Mujer (Paulina Rubio, 2001)
 Es Por Ti (Juanes, 2002)
 Se Lo Que Vendrá/The Other Side (Fey,2002)

Television
 "Aprender a vivir" (1982)
 "Amada" (1983)
 "Por siempre tuyo" (1985)
 "Rossé" (1985)
 "Cuñada, La" (1987)
 "Ella contra mí" (1988)
 "Sin marido" (1988)
 "Así son los míos" (1989)
 "Extraña dama, La" (1989) a.k.a. "The Strange Lady" 
 "Amándote II" (1990)
 "El Evangelio según Marcos" (1991) a.k.a. "The Gospel According to Mark" 
 "Chiquilina mía" (1991)
 "Soy Gina" (1992)
 "Machos, Los" (1994)
 "Alta comedia" (1996)
 "Señoras y señores" (1997)
 "Casa natal" (1998)
 "Vulnerables" (1999)
 "Tiempofinal" (2000) a.k.a. "Final Minute" 
 "Primicias" (2000)
 "Cuatro amigas" (2001) a.k.a. "Four Friends" 
 "Franco Buenaventura, el profe" (2002) a.k.a. "Tango Lover" 
 "Tres padres solteros" (2003)
 "Mystiko" (2004)
 "Familia especial, Una" (2005)
 "Vientos de agua"  (2006)

References

External links
 

1955 births
Argentine male film actors
Living people
People from Buenos Aires